Forgotten Faces is a 1936 American drama film directed by Ewald André Dupont and starring Herbert Marshall, Gertrude Michael and James Burke. Marshall and Michael had also starred in Till We Meet Again earlier in 1936.

The film was based on a short story by Richard Washburn Child, which had previously been made as a 1928 silent film by Paramount.

Partial cast
 Herbert Marshall as Harry Ashton  
 Gertrude Michael as Cleo Ashton  
 James Burke as Sgt. Johnny Donovan 
 Robert Cummings as Clinton Faraday  
 Betty Jane Rhodes as Sally McBride  
 Robert Gleckler as Mike Davidson  
 Arthur Hohl as Hi-Jack Eddie  
 Alonzo Price as Warden Davis  
 Pierre Watkin as Mr. McBride  
 Alan Edwards as Steve Deland  
 Dora Clement as Mrs. McBride
 Ann Evers as Maid  
 Mary Gordon as Mrs. O'Leary  
 Andrea Leeds as Salesgirl  
 Bess Flowers as Nurse  
 Carolyn Ganzer as Baby  
 Irving Bacon as Pretty  
 Chick Chandler as Chick  
 Robert Emmett Keane as Fields  
 Jack Norton as Drunk  
 Ruth Warren as Nurse
 Paul Newlan as Guard

Production
Dupont made the film as part of a three-picture contract with Paramount Pictures.

Cummings was cast in April 1936.

References

Bibliography
 St. Pierre, Paul Matthew. E.A. Dupont and His Contribution to British Film. Fairleigh Dickinson University Press, 2010 .

External links

1936 films
American drama films
American black-and-white films
1936 drama films
Films directed by E. A. Dupont
Paramount Pictures films
Films based on short fiction
Films scored by John Leipold
Remakes of American films
Sound film remakes of silent films
1930s English-language films
1930s American films